Melica stricta is a species of grass known by the common name rock melic.

Distribution
It is native to California, Oregon, Nevada, and Utah in the western United States. It grows in mountain and plateau habitats, including areas with an alpine climate.

Description
It is a perennial bunchgrass which varies in maximum height from 10 to 90 centimeters. The inflorescence is a narrow panicle of V-shaped green and purple banded spikelets.

References

External links
Calflora Database: Melica stricta (Nodding melic,  nodding melica, rock melicgrass)
Jepson Manual Treatment - Melica stricta
Herbarium.edu: Melica stricta

stricta
Bunchgrasses of North America
Grasses of the United States
Native grasses of California
Alpine flora
Flora of the Sierra Nevada (United States)
Flora of Oregon
Flora of Nevada
Flora of Utah
Natural history of the Santa Monica Mountains
Natural history of the Transverse Ranges
Flora without expected TNC conservation status